Meet Me at Bebarfalds is an Australian television series which aired 1958 to 1959 on Sydney station TCN-9. Hosted by Chuck Faulkner, the series was broadcast from now-defunct retail store Bebarfalds. It aired at 2:00PM. An article in the Sydney Morning Herald, while not mentioning the series by name, described the format as including shoppers being asked topical questions, along with game show segments and a celebrity guest. Like most early Australian series, it aired in a single city only.

References

External links

Nine Network original programming
1950s Australian game shows
Australian television talk shows
Australian live television series
1958 Australian television series debuts
1959 Australian television series endings
Australian non-fiction television series
Black-and-white Australian television shows
English-language television shows